William Taverner may refer to:
William Taverner (surveyor) (–1768), Newfoundland plantation owner and surveyor
William Taverner (New Zealand politician) (1879–1958), New Zealand politician
William J. Taverner, American sex educator/author
William Taverner (dramatist) (died 1731), English lawyer
William Taverner (artist) (1703–1772), English judge, son of the dramatist
William Taverner (fl.1397-1407), MP for Leominster
William Taverner (MP for Lyme Regis) in 1417
William the Taverner, MP for Lichfield (UK Parliament constituency)